Division No. 6 is a census division in Alberta, Canada. It includes the City of Calgary and surrounding areas. The majority of the division consists of Alberta's Calgary Region, while the northern portion of the division includes parts of central Alberta. The division also forms the southern segment of the Calgary–Edmonton Corridor. Division No. 6 is the largest census division in Alberta according to population and also has the highest population density.

Census subdivisions 
The following census subdivisions (municipalities or municipal equivalents) are located within Alberta's Division No. 6.

Cities
Airdrie
Calgary
Chestermere
Towns
Carstairs
Cochrane
Crossfield
Didsbury
Diamond Valley
High River
Irricana
Okotoks
Olds
Sundre
Villages
Beiseker
Cremona
Longview
Municipal districts
Foothills County
Mountain View County
Rocky View County
First Nation reserves
Eden Valley 216
Tsuu T'ina Nation 145

Demographics 

See also 
List of census divisions of Alberta
List of communities in Alberta

References 

D06
Calgary Region